Governor Sununu may refer to:

Chris Sununu (born 1974), 82nd Governor of New Hampshire
John H. Sununu (born 1939), 75th Governor of New Hampshire and father of Chris